The Alor Setar City Council (abbreviated MBAS) is the city council which administers the city of Alor Setar in the state of Kedah, Malaysia. This council was established after the city was officially granted city status on 21 December 2003. Their jurisdiction covers an area of 333 square kilometres and administrates the whole Kota Setar District (where the Alor Setar city centre is located) and Pokok Sena District in Kedah.

The council consists of the mayor plus twenty-four councillors appointed to serve a one-year term by the Kedah State Government.

History 
Alor Star Sanitary Board was established in 1905. It changed into Alor Star Municipal Board in 1958 and then was upgraded to Kota Setar District Council on 1 March 1976, once again upgraded to Kota Setar Municipal Council on 1 February 1978 and eventually declared as Alor Star City Council on 21 December 2003.

Approaching Alor Star beginning as a “City” in the month of December 2003, complete its age of 268 years since it was established on 31 December 1735. With this, it is proved that Alor Star City is one of the oldest town in the Southeast Asian region.

Appointed mayors of Alor Setar 
Since 2003, the city has been led by five mayors. The previous mayors are listed as below:

Current appointed councillors 
 Fouzi Ali
 Rohaizad Rashid
 Norizan Khazali
 Mokhtar Hasran
 Robi Desa
 Abd Jalil Abdul Majid
 Rozi Jidin
 Ishak Hussain
 Ahmad Fitri Othman
 Mohd Fuad Mohd Isa
 Varatharajoo Krishnan
 Muniandy Ramaya
 Teoh Boon Teong
 Cheah Kee Chong
 Zakaria Nayan
 Abdul Muthalib Harun
 Mohd Guntor Mansor Tobeng
 Abdul Kadir Mohamad
 Lee Seong Joo
 Mohamad Abdullah
 Mohd Kholib Hamid
 Salmah Mt. Isa

External links 

Alor Setar
Local government in Kedah
City councils in Malaysia
2003 establishments in Malaysia